San Bernardo is a town and municipality in the Nariño Department, Colombia.

Climate
San Bernando has a warm subtropical highland climate (Köppen Cfb) with moderate to heavy rainfall year-round. Like most of Andean Nariño Department but unlike most places with a subtropical highland climate, San Bernando has a marked summer minimum in rainfall instead of the more usual winter minimum.

References

Municipalities of Nariño Department